Ji-Hae Park (born in Germany) is a German born Korean violinist. Currently she serves as the professor at the Yonsei University, CEO of the culture innovation Group 'Value Creation J Company' inc., and runs two youtube channels 'Ji-Hae Park TV' and 'Value Creation'.

Biography

Ji-Hae Park was born in Germany. She took her first violin lesson from her mother, Lee Yeun-Hong, who is also a violinist. Park has been named Honorary Ambassador for the 2018 PyeongChang Winter Olympic Games highlighted by the Yonhapnews Agency, “Park, is a fan of winter sports and an accomplished skater. In July, Park posted a promotional video on her Web site in which she plays the violin while doing figure skating and competes against men playing hockey.”  She was recognized as The Respected Korean 2010 with Grand Prix and considered to be the youngest winner ever. This distinction is given to a Korean who has shown great leadership and influence in encouraging national development and integration for the benefit of the Nation from the FISLEA (International Professional Association), the Magazine Consumer Union Times the SYB-TV. She played a rare violin known as the Petrus Guarnerius 1735, Venedig which was on loan by the German Foundation (Deutsche Stiftung Musikleben) for eight years starting in 2003.
 
Park is the Honorary Ambassador of the Yeosu 2012 World Expo. Her successful New York Debut at Carnegie Hall was documented by the New York Concert Review, "Her stage persona is extremely charismatic and emotional, and she was able to bring out all the stylistic and dynamic contrasts of her varied composers." In her first performance at Carnegie Hall, Park started off the "Hope & Love Concert" with Saint-Saëns' "Danse Macabre", famous in South Korea for being the music that figure-skating champion Yuna Kim used for her gold medal winning short program at the 2009 World Figure Skating Championships. Park followed that with Mozart's Violin Concerto No. 3, Pablo de Sarasate's Zigeunerweisen ("Gypsy Airs"), and "When Mama Goes to Pick an Oyster," a Korean children's song. She is the two time 1st Prize winner of the National Music Competition of Germany Jugend musiziert in 2001 (in Solo) and 2002 (in Chamber music).

In 2003, Park won the 2nd prize including 3 special prizes at Remember Enescu International Violin Competition in Romania. At Johann Georg Pisendel Dresden Germany she won over the judges by playing Mozarts Violin Sonata no. 21. Apart from those distinctions, she was awarded at the Kloster Schoental International Competition in Germany, Brahms InternationalCompetition in Austria, Andrea Postacchini International Competition in Italy, Juergen Sellheim Hannover Germany, Pinchas Zukerman Award for outstanding talent & potential. She was also honored as a ZIRP Fellow (the abbreviation of the Cultures-initiative of Rheinland-Pfalz's culture in Germany).

Performance experience

Park performed for The New Year's Concert with Nanse Gum and the Euro-Asian Philharmonic Orchestra in what may be considered to be three of the most important concert halls in Korea. She was the first instrumental soloist invited to perform at the Korea National Prayer Breakfast 2010 with the President of South Korea and leaders from nearly 50 countries in attendance. She also performed for the Christmas tree Lightning ceremony of Korea at Seoul City Hall; a solo performance at the New Year's Concert with Shinik Hahm and in Memoriam of Kwangju Uprising with the KBS Symphony Orchestra; and a solo recital for the closing ceremony in The Seoul International Financial Forum this event was known called the biggest event in Asia by many people.

Her US concert tour in 2011 included recitals at Carnegie Hall in New York City (during the opening week of the 2011-2012 season) and Kennedy Center in Washington, DC McLean Bible Church (MBC) Washington DC, LA Full Gospel Church (before an audience of more than 1,000).

She has performed in concert halls all over the world: USA, South Korea, China, Switzerland, England, Italy, Germany (like the Rokoko Theater Schwetzingen, Dresden Frauenkirche, Grosser Saal in der Glocke, Bremen, etc.) She performed the Introduction et Rondo Capriccioso, Op. 28 by Camille Saint-Saëns with the LA Symphony for the 2012 Summer Concert. Park has a future performance scheduled with the Shanghai Symphony Orchestra in the Shanghai Concert Hall, and an upcoming CD recording with Universal Music Korea. From April to June 2012, TED (Conference) held special salons in 14 cities on six continents seeking to uncover new talents, voices and ideas the world needs to hear. The salons took place in Amsterdam, Bangalore, Doha, Johannesburg, London, Nairobi, New York, São Paulo, Seoul, Shanghai, Sydney, Tokyo, Tunis and Vancouver. Park was selected among 20 finalists. In addition to performing many solo recitals and concerts with orchestra throughout the world, Park also performs in many churches.

Awards and recognition

Yeosu 2012 World Expo, WWCF, World WIKE City Federation. The Korean Christian Art & Music Council, The Handong
Global University (Unesco List), Africa Future Foundation.
She has been invited to play for many national events such as the 42nd National Prayer Breakfast, National
Christmas Lighting Ceremony, the Korean Embassy in Washington and KORUS House. She studied with Professor Ulf Hoelscher at Hochschule für Musik in Germany (KE Degree-the highest music degree in Germany), and Professor Jaime Laredo at Indiana University with a full scholarship and additional financial support through the Bucerius Scholarship sponsored by the German Federal Music Department. Additional musical support was received from the violinist Midori Goto. In 2011, she appeared on many major Korean TV and Radio networks such as KBS (National Broadcasting System), CBS, Radio Korea NY; Radio Korea LA, and Atlanta just to mention a few. Her most notable appearance was on the popular TV show “Star King” which has gained considerable public popularity. She is also named as the consultant of National G20 Policy Consultation from the Blue House, the Korean presidential Residence. Her discography exemplifies the breadth and depth of her musical experience in many genres from classical to Pop, traditional Korean Folk Tunes, Gospel, etc. Park arranged all of the colorful elements on each of her CDs. She was a featured Ignite Talk Speaker and soloist at the Awards of Excellence Dinner at NATCON15 in Kissimmee, FL. Park enjoys experimenting and modifying new musical selections to make the classical violin more accessible to audiences

Discography

References

External links 
 
 

1985 births
Living people
South Korean violinists
German people of South Korean descent
21st-century violinists